Raoul Marian Kristian Schránil (24 March 1910 – 20 September 1998) was a Czech film actor.

Life
Schránil was born in Most on 24 March 1910. His father Rudolf Schránil was a government secretary. His mother Alexandra Poláková was a singer. Shortly after his birth he moved to Vienna with his parents. During the World War I he was sent to live with his grandmother in Chotětov. After the war his family moved to Prague. His family friend was an opera singer Emmy Destinn. Schránil was expelled from high school in Prague and went to study in Germany and later in Dijon, France. He spoke Czech, French, German and English. After a recommendation from his cousin, a film director Karl Anton, he was hired in Vlasta Burian's theatre in 1935.

His first role was in the film Milan Rastislav Štefánik, where he played a French officer. In the 1930s and 1940s he was often typecast as a romantic lead. During the German occupation he founded his own cinema in Chotětov called Vlast (lit. Homeland). He was a member of Czechoslovak resistance and was hiding two escaped British soldiers until the end of the war. After the communist coup he was arrested, due to a suspicion that he wanted to emigrate. He spent one year in custody. He was not allowed to be hired by theatres, because of his bourgeois origins. He had to work as a labourer until he was able to find work in a cabaret and small provincial theatres.
He died in Prague on 20 September 1998.

His daughter Xandra Schránilová was an actress in Semafor theatre.

Selected filmography
 Vzdušné torpédo 48 (1937)
 Cause for Divorce (1937)
 Battalion (1937)
 The Merry Wives (1938)
 Christian (1939)
 Eva Fools Around (1939)
 The Minister's Girlfriends (1940)
 Poznej svého muže (1940)
 The Catacombs (1940)
 In the Still of the Night (1941)
 A Charming Man (1941)
 Nebe a dudy (1943)
 The Second Shot (1943)
 Fourteen at the Table (1943)
 Silvery Wind (1954)
 How to Drown Dr. Mracek, the Lawyer (1974)
 Love Between the Raindrops (1979)
 Big Beat (1993)

References

External links
 

1910 births
1998 deaths
People from Most (city)
Czech male film actors
Czech male stage actors
20th-century Czech male actors